Balaram Palace is a palace situated on the bank of Balaram River in Chitrasani village of Banaskantha district of Gujarat, India. It is now converted into hotel.

History 

Palace was built during 1922 to 1936 by Sir Tale Muhammad Khan, 29th Nawab of Palanpur State.

See also 
 Palanpur State
 Balaram Ambaji Wildlife Sanctuary

References

External links 
 Balaram Palace website

Palaces in Gujarat
Banaskantha district
Tourist attractions in Banaskantha district
Hotels in India